The Mikulov Highlands is a mountain range in the South Moravian Region of the Czech Republic. The Highlands, together with the Waschberg Zone and Lower Austria Inselberg threshold, form the South-Moravian Carpathians.

Geography

The Mikulov Highlands rise to the south of the Thaya between Nový Přerov, the Nové Mlýny reservoirs, Bulhary, Mikulov, and the Austrian border.

To the north is the Thaya River valley, the natural border with Lower Morava Valley. To the east is the mountainous region between the Thaya and Včelínek, also from the Lower Morava Valley. To the southeast is the March Field, and to the southwest a ridge in Austria in the Waschberg Zone which forms the western border of the Thaya valley. Geomorphological subunits form Pálava (Pavlov Hills) and the hill country Milovická pahorkatina.

The mountain range is partly fenced and contains several vineyards that constitute part of the Mikulovská wine sub-region. Most of the Highlands are, since 1976, part of the large nature reserve Pálava Landscape Protected Area and since 1986 registered by UNESCO as biosphere reserve Dolní Morava.

References
 Geografický místopisný slovník, Academia, Praha, 1993. 

Mountain ranges of the Czech Republic
Mountain ranges of the Western Carpathians
Highlands
Břeclav District